Shipaiqiao Station is a station of Line 3 of the Guangzhou Metro. It started operations on 30 December 2006. It is located in Tianhe District, underneath Tianhe Road between East Tianhe Road and East Tiyu Road.

Station layout

Exits

Around the station
 TaiKoo Hui

References

Railway stations in China opened in 2006
Guangzhou Metro stations in Tianhe District